Sante Ranucci (born 31 October 1933) is a retired Italian cyclist who won the amateur road race at the 1955 UCI Road World Championships. After that, he competed as a professional until 1964. In 1958, he finished second in the Giro del Lazio.

References 

1933 births
Living people
Italian male cyclists
Sportspeople from the Province of Viterbo
Cyclists from Lazio